is a professional Japanese baseball player. He plays pitcher for the Yokohama DeNA BayStars. He previously played for the Chunichi Dragons.

Career

Amateur career
Kashara was admitted to Niigata University of Health and Welfare without consideration for his baseball talent and was able to, over time, increase his velocity from throwing in the mid 130s (km/h) to throwing in the high 140s (km/h).In the 2016 university fall league, he achieved a 0.72 ERA, claimed the most wins title and was chosen in the Best 9.

Chunichi Dragons
Kasahara was the 4th pick for the Chunichi Dragons at the 2016 Nippon Professional Baseball draft.

Yokohama DeNA Baystars
On 9 December 2022, Kasahara was traded for Seiya Hosokawa in the 2022 Current Player Draft.

International career
On October 10, 2018, he was selected Japan national baseball team at the 2018 MLB Japan All-Star Series.

References

1995 births
Living people
Chunichi Dragons players
Yokohama DeNA BayStars players
Japanese baseball players
Nippon Professional Baseball pitchers
Baseball people from Niigata Prefecture